It Had to Be You may refer to:

Film and television
 It Had to Be You (1947 film), an American romantic comedy film
 "It Had to Be You" (Perfect Strangers), a 1992 episode of Perfect Strangers
 It Had to Be You (TV series), a 1993 American sitcom
 It Had To Be You (2000 film), a romantic comedy with Natasha Henstridge and Michael Vartan
 It Had to Be You!, a 2005 Hong Kong romantic comedy film

Literature
 It Had to Be You, a 2007 novel in the Gossip Girl novel series

 It Had to Be You (Phillips novel), a romance novel by Susan Elizabeth Phillips

Music
 "It Had to Be You" (song), a 1924 song by Isham Jones and Gus Kahn
 It Had to Be You (album), a 1991 Harry Connick, Jr. album
 It Had to Be You: The Great American Songbook, a 2002 Rod Stewart album